The Maranhão slider (Trachemys adiutrix), also commonly known as the Brazilian slider or Carvalho's slider, is a species of turtle in the family Emydidae.

Geographic range
Trachemys adiutrix is endemic to northeastern Brazil. One of its English common names refers to the Brazilian state of Maranhão, but it also occurs in the Brazilian state of Piauí.

Etymology
The specific name, adiutrix, which is Latin feminine for "helper", comes in honor of Dr. Maria do Socorro Pinheiro, field companion of Vanzolini. Her surname, Socorro, means "help" in Portuguese.

The eponym, Carvalho's slider, is in honor of Brazilian herpetologist Antenor Leitão de Carvalho.

Taxonomy
T. adiutrix is sometimes considered a subspecies of T. dorbigni as T. dorbigni adiutrix.

References

Further reading

Baillie, Jonathan E. M.; Groombridge, Brian (1996). "Trachemys adiutrix ". The IUCN Red List of Threatened Species 1996. IUCN Conservation Library Series. Gland, Switzerland: International Union for Conservation of Nature. 448 pp. .
Vanzolini, P.E. (1995). "A new species of turtle, genus Trachemys, from the state of Maranhão, Brazil (Testudines, Emydidae)". Revista Brasileira de Biologia 55 (1): 111-125. (Trachemys adiutrix, new species).

Trachemys
Turtles of South America
Endemic fauna of Brazil
Reptiles of Brazil
Endangered animals
Endangered biota of South America
Reptiles described in 1995
Taxonomy articles created by Polbot